Eaton House may refer to:

in England
 The Eaton House Group of Schools, a group of private schools in London, England

in the United States (by state then city)
Aaron James Eaton House, Eaton, Colorado, listed on the National Register of Historic Places (NRHP) in Weld County, Colorado
Mylius–Eaton House, Sioux City, Iowa, NRHP-listed
Tarr–Eaton House, Harpswell Center, Maine, NRHP-listed
Eaton House (Wells, Maine), NRHP-listed
Moses Eaton Jr. House, Harrisville, New Hampshire, NRHP-listed
 Eaton House (Watchung, New Jersey), a historic house in Watchung, New Jersey
Nestor P. Eaton House, Socorro, New Mexico, listed on the National Register of Historic Places in Socorro County, New Mexico
Abel E. Eaton House, Union, Oregon, NRHP-listed
Eaton House (Houston, Texas), NRHP-listed in Harris County, Texas